Zhang Jinzhe (25 September 1920 – 24 December 2022) was a Chinese pediatrician, and an academician of the Chinese Academy of Engineering.

Zhang was a member of the 7th and 8th National Committee of the Chinese People's Political Consultative Conference.

Biography
Zhang was born in Ninghe County (now Ninghe District of Tianjin), Hebei, on 25 September 1920. He attended Tianjin Yaohua High School, and graduated from Yenching University, Peking Union Medical College, St. John's University, Shanghai, and Shanghai Medical College.

Since June 1947, Zhang successively served as attending surgeon, teaching assistant, lecturer, associate professor at the Affiliated Hospital to Medical College of Peking University. From 1951 to 1953, he worked as a surgeon in the Korean battlefield during the Korean War. In June 1955, he was recruited by the newly founded , and worked until 2011, when he was transferred to the Beijing Hu Yamei Children's Medical Research Institute as its president. He joined the Chinese Communist Party (CCP) in December 1956.

On 24 December 2022, Zhang died in Beijing, at the age of 102.

Honours and awards
 1997 Member of the Chinese Academy of Engineering (CAE)
 2002 Honorary Fellow of the Royal College of Surgeons (RCS)

References

1920 births
2022 deaths
Engineers from Tianjin
Chinese surgeons
Yenching University alumni
St. John's University, Shanghai alumni
Peking Union Medical College alumni
Fudan University alumni
Members of the Chinese Academy of Engineering
Members of the 7th Chinese People's Political Consultative Conference
Members of the 8th Chinese People's Political Consultative Conference
Chinese centenarians
Men centenarians